Raymond Francis Clevenger (June 6, 1926 – March 29, 2016) was an American lawyer and politician who served one term as a U.S. Representative from the state of Michigan between 1965 and 1967.

Biography 
Clevenger was born in Chicago and attended schools in Oak Park, Illinois, graduating from high school in 1944. He served in the United States Army Medical Corps from July 1944 to July 1946.  He resumed his education and attended Roosevelt University in Chicago and the London School of Economics and Political Science. While at Roosevelt, he was elected student council president, and served alongside future Chicago mayor Harold Washington, who was the student council vice president. He graduated from Roosevelt University in 1949 and from the University of Michigan Law School in 1952.

Career 
He began the practice of law in Sault Ste. Marie, Michigan in 1953. He was a delegate to Democratic State Conventions, 1954–1964 and a delegate to the 1956 Democratic National Convention. He practiced law in Illinois, as well as Michigan, and before the United States federal courts and served as Chippewa County Circuit Court Commissioner, 1958–1960. He was a member of the Democratic State Central Committee, 1958–1960.  He was also Michigan Corporation and Securities Commissioner, 1961–1963.

Congress 
In 1964, he defeated incumbent Republican Victor A. Knox to be elected as a Democrat from Michigan's 11th congressional district to the Eighty-ninth Congress, serving from January 3, 1965, to January 3, 1967. He was known as one of the Michigan Five Fluke Freshmen and was an unsuccessful candidate for reelection in 1966, and again in 1968, losing both times to Republican Philip Ruppe.

Later career and death 
Clevenger was appointed by U.S. President Lyndon B. Johnson as chairman, Great Lakes Basin Commission, 1967–1968. He later resumed the practice of law and campaigned in 1989 for Mayor of Ann Arbor, Michigan, losing to Republican incumbent Gerald D. Jernigan. He latterly resided in Ann Arbor and died in March 2016 at the age of 89.

References 

 
 The Political Graveyard

1926 births
2016 deaths
20th-century American lawyers
United States Army personnel of World War II
Democratic Party members of the United States House of Representatives from Michigan
Illinois lawyers
Michigan lawyers
Military personnel from Michigan
People from Sault Ste. Marie, Michigan
Politicians from Chicago
Roosevelt University alumni
United States Army soldiers
University of Michigan Law School alumni